Alexander John Motyl (born October 21, 1953) is an American historian, political scientist, poet, writer, translator and artist-painter. He is a resident of New York City. He is professor of political science at Rutgers University in Newark, New Jersey and a specialist on Ukraine, Russia, and the Soviet Union.

Motyl's parents emigrated from Western Ukraine. He was born in New York City on October 21, 1953.  He graduated from Regis High School in New York City in 1971. He studied at Columbia University, graduating with a BA in History in 1975 and a Ph.D. in Political Science in 1984. Motyl has taught at Columbia University, Lehigh University, the Ukrainian Free University, the Kyiv-Mohyla University, and Harvard University and is currently professor of political science at Rutgers University-Newark.  Aside from academic work, he also writes opinion columns in publications such as Foreign Policy, 19FortyFive, and the Kyiv Post.

Academic career 
Motyl is the author of eight academic books and editor or co-editor of over fifteen volumes. Motyl has written extensively on the Soviet Union, Ukraine, revolutions, nations and nationalism, and empires. All his work is highly conceptual and theoretical, attempting to ground political science in a firm philosophical base, while simultaneously concluding that all theories are imperfect and that theoretical pluralism is inevitable. In Imperial Ends (2001), he posited a theoretical framework for examining the structure of empires as a political structure. Motyl describes three types of imperial structures: continuous, discontinuous, and hybrid. Motyl also posits varying degrees of empire: formal, informal, and hegemonic. He discussed the Russian example in an earlier book, The Post Soviet Nations.

Other activities
Motyl is also active as a poet, a writer of fiction, and a visual artist. A collection of his poems have appeared in "Vanishing Points". His novels include Whiskey Priest (2005), Who Killed Andrei Warhol (2007), Flippancy (2009), The Jew Who Was Ukrainian, My Orchidia (2012), Sweet Snow (2013), Fall River, Vovochka (2015), Ardor (2016), A Russian in Berlin (2021), Pitun's Last Stand (2021) and Lowest East Side (2022). He has done readings of his fiction and poetry at New York's Cornelia Street Cafe and Bowery Poetry Club. Motyl has had one-man shows of his art in New York, Toronto, and Philadelphia. His artwork is part on the permanent collections of the Ukrainian Museum in New York City and the Ukrainian Cultural Centre in Winnipeg. 

Motyl is also a contributing editor to the national security publication 19FortyFive. He is the 2019 Laureate of the Omelian and Tatiana Antonovych Foundation. According to Academic Influence, Motyl was ranked sixth among the “Top Ten Most Influential Political Scientists Today.”  

In 2008–2014, he collaborated with former Andy Warhol Superstar Ultra Violet on a play entitled Andy vs. Adolf, which attempted to explore the similarities and differences between Warhol and Hitler. Although two readings of the play took place, the work was never produced. Motyl subsequently described his working relationship with Ultra Violet in an essay in the magazine 34th Parallel.

In a review of his novel The Jew Who Was Ukrainian, Michael Johnson wrote in The American Spectator: 
 Protagonist Volodymyr Frauenzimmer was born of a rape at the end of World War II, when his mother was a Ukrainian Auschwitz guard who hates Jews and his father a Stalinist thug and Jew who hates Ukrainians. They married but lived in separate rooms and rarely spoke to each other... Alexander Motyl was clearly having great fun when he wrote his latest book, The Jew Who Was Ukrainian, a comic novel with half-serious historical underpinnings. It manages to amuse and challenge without losing its headlong momentum into the realm of absurdist literature.

Selected works
 Academic books
 The Turn to the Right: The Ideological Origins and Development of Ukrainian Nationalism, 1919-1929, (East European Monographs, no. 65; Columbia University Press, 1980). 
 Will the Non-Russians Rebel? State, Ethnicity, and Stability in the USSR, (Cornell University Press, 1987). 
 Sovietology, Rationality, Nationality: Coming to Grips with Nationalism in the USSR (Columbia University Press, 1990). 
 Dilemmas of Independence: Ukraine after Totalitarianism, (Council on Foreign Relations Press, 1993). 
 Revolutions, Nations, Empires: Conceptual Limits and Theoretical Possibilities, (Columbia University Press, 1999). 
 Imperial Ends: The Decline, Collapse, and Revival of Empires, (Columbia University Press, 2001). 
 Ukraine vs Russia: Revolution, Democracy, and War. Washington, DC: Westphalia Press, 2017.
 Bits and Pieces: Fragmentary Memoirs. Amazon KDP, 2020.
 National Questions: Theoretical Reflections on Nations and Nationalism in Eastern Europe. Ibidem, 2022.
 Editor 
 Between America and Galicia: The Memoirs of Maria and Alexander Motyl. Lviv: Manuskrypt, 2019. 
 The Great West Ukrainian Prison Massacre of 1941: A Sourcebook. Amsterdam: Amsterdam University Press, 2016. Co-edited with Ksenya Kiebuzinski.
 The Holodomor Reader: A Sourcebook on the Famine of 1932-1933 in Ukraine, co-edited with Bohdan Klid, (University of Alberta Press, 2012). 
 Russia’s Engagement with the West: Transformation and Integration in the Twenty-First Century, co-edited with Blair Ruble and Lilia Shevtsova, (Routledge, 2005). 
 The Encyclopedia of Nationalism, 2 vols., (Academic Press, 2000).

References

External links
 Rutgers faculty bio
 Web site
 
 Alexander Motyl, "Back to Latin", New York Times, July 6, 2009

Historians of Ukraine
20th-century American historians
20th-century American male writers
Artists from New York City
Living people
1953 births
Scholars of nationalism
Columbia College (New York) alumni
Lehigh University faculty
Harvard University faculty
Rutgers University faculty
Regis High School (New York City) alumni
Historians from New York (state)
American male non-fiction writers
21st-century American historians
21st-century American male writers
American people of Ukrainian descent
American political commentators
Imperialism studies
Historians of Russia
Historians of the Soviet Union